Punomys is a genus of rodent in the family Cricetidae. It contains the following species:
 Eastern puna mouse (Punomys kofordi)
 Puna mouse (Punomys lemminus)

References

 
Rodent genera
Taxonomy articles created by Polbot